Robert Nall Bodine (December 17, 1837 – March 16, 1914) was a U.S. Representative from Missouri.

Born near Paris, Missouri, Bodine attended Paris Academy and was graduated from the University of Missouri in 1859. He served as principal of the Paris public schools. He studied law. He was admitted to the bar and began practice in Paris, Missouri. He served as prosecuting attorney of Monroe County. He served as delegate to the State convention in 1890. He served as member of the State house of representatives in 1895–1897.

Bodine was elected as a Democrat to the Fifty-fifth Congress (March 4, 1897 – March 3, 1899). He was an unsuccessful candidate for renomination in 1898. He resumed the practice of law in Paris, Missouri, and died there March 16, 1914. He was interred in Walnut Grove Cemetery.

References

1837 births
1914 deaths
University of Missouri alumni
People from Paris, Missouri
Democratic Party members of the United States House of Representatives from Missouri
Democratic Party members of the Missouri House of Representatives
19th-century American politicians